New France, Nova Scotia may refer to:

New France, Antigonish, Nova Scotia
New France, Digby, Nova Scotia

See also
 New France (disambiguation)
 Nova Scotia (disambiguation)